A list of all international Test Matches played by the Springboks.

Overall 
South Africa's overall Test Match record against all nations, updated to 20 November 2022, is as follows:

2020s
2020s record

2022
2022 record

2021
2021 record

2010s
2010s record

2019
2019 record

2018
2018 record

2017
2017 record

2016
2016 record

2015
2015 record

2014
2014 record

2013
2013 record

2012
2012 record

2011
2011 record

2010
2010 record

2000s
2000s record

2009
2009 record

2008
2008 record

2007
2007 record

2006
2006 record

2005
2005 record

2004
2004 record

2003
2003 record

2002
2002 record

2001
2001 record

2000
2000 record

1990s
1990s record

1999
1999 record

1998
1998 record

1997
1997 record

1996
1996 record

1995
1995 record

1994
1994 record

1993
1993 record

1992
1992 record

1980s
1980s record

1989
1989 record

1986
1986 record

1984
1984 record

1982
1982 record

1981
1981 record

1980
1980 record

1970s
1970s record

1977
1977 record

1976
1976 record

1975
1975 record

1974
1974 record

1972
1972 record

1971
1971 record

1970
1970 record

1960s
1960s record

1969
1969 record

1968
1968 record

1967
1967 record

1965
1965 record

1964
1964 record

1963
1963 record

1962
1962 record

1961
1961 record

1960
1960 record

1950s
1950s record

1958
1958 record

1956
1956 record

1955
1955 record

1953
1953 record

1952
1952 record

1951
1951 record

1940s
1940s record

1949
1949 record

1930s
1930s record

1938
1938 record

1937
1937 record

1933
1933 record

1932
1932 record

1931
1931 record

1920s
1920s record

1928
1928 record

1924
1924 record

1921
1921 record

1910s
1910s record

1913
1913 record

1912
1912 record

1910
1910 record

1900s
1900s record

1906
1906 record

1903
1903 record

1890s
1890s record

1896
1896 record

1891
1891 record

References

 
Lists of national rugby union team results
Matches